, better known by the stage name , is a Japanese voice actress, singer and narrator from Niihama, Ehime. She is represented by the agency StarCrew. Mizuki was trained as an enka singer, releasing one single under her birth name in 1993 and made her debut as a voice actress in 1996. Her prominent roles include Hinata Hyuga in the long-running ninja series Naruto as well in Boruto: Naruto Next Generations, Tamao Tamamura in Shaman King 2001 and 2021, Colette Brunel in Tales of Symphonia, Fate Testarossa in Magical Girl Lyrical Nanoha, Tsubasa Kazanari in Symphogear, Moka Akashiya in Rosario + Vampire, Tsubomi Hanasaki (Cure Blossom) in Heartcatch Precure! and Ann Takamaki in Persona 5. She also had official dubbing roles in live action version of Itazura na Kiss from Korea and Taiwan, as well in Hunger Games film series as Katniss Everdeen (played by Jennifer Lawrence). She is also the famous dubbing roles for Ariel Lin.

Mizuki released her first single, "Omoi", under the King Records label in 2000. A year later, she released her debut album, Supersonic Girl, in 2001. In the years that followed, Mizuki enjoyed modest success that concluded with the release of her single "Innocent Starter", which reached the top 10 Oricon singles chart, charting at No. 9. Since then, Mizuki's releases have charted steadily higher in Japan, establishing her as a successful singer in the country. In 2009, her album Ultimate Diamond reached #1, her first release to do so; while her single "Phantom Minds", released in 2010, also charted at #1. Mizuki is the first voice actress to top the weekly Oricon albums chart and the weekly Oricon singles chart since its inception in 1968.

Early life
Born in Niihama, Ehime, she began to train singing enka when she was five years old. In 1993, she released a Compact Cassette single  as Nana Kondō. However, she passed the audition of game Noël: La Neige and became a voice actress.

Career
Mizuki released an image song single titled "Girl's Age" under the name Chisato Kadokura in 1997. When she performed her first concert at the age of 20, she was scouted by the Japanese record label King Records. Her debut single as Nana Mizuki, "Omoi", was released on December 6, 2000. Her 2004 song "Innocent Starter" became her first Top 10 single and her 2005 single "Eternal Blaze" reached No. 2 position on Japanese Oricon weekly single charts.

Mizuki won the "Best Musical Performance" award by her song "Justice to Believe" in the first Seiyu Awards in 2007. Since her seventh album Ultimate Diamond debuted at the No. 1 position on Oricon weekly album charts during the week of June 15, 2009, she became the first voice actress to reach the No. 1 position on the Oricon weekly album or single charts since its creation in 1968. Ultimate Diamond sold over 74,000 copies in the first week. In addition, her 21st single, "Phantom Minds", became the first voice actress single to top the charts, debuting at the No. 1 position on the issue of Oricon weekly single charts dated January 25, 2010.

On November 23, 2009, NHK announced that Mizuki would take part in the 60th NHK Kōhaku Uta Gassen of New Year's Eve. It was Mizuki's first time appearing on the show. Nana chose her song "Shin'ai" for her performance.

She is well known for voicing female characters who are very shy yet kind-hearted and gentle, and many of the characters she has voiced were initially very shy/soft-spoken (however, after interactions with other people, they gradually opened up (e.g. Fate Testarossa from Magical Girl Lyrical Nanoha, Nyamo from Love Hina, Hinata Hyūga from Naruto, Wrath from Fullmetal Alchemist (2003) and Tsubomi Hanasaki from Heartcatch Precure!). She's also well known for voicing females with romantic affection for protagonists, as six of her characters have romantic feelings for the main characters (Oboro from Basilisk, Hinata Hyūga from Naruto, Colette Brunel from Tales of Symphonia, Tamao Tamamura from Shaman King, Moka Akashiya from Rosario + Vampire and Fate Testarossa from Magical Girl Lyrical Nanoha), some of her characters craved maternal attention (e.g. Fate Testarossa from Magical Girl Lyrical Nanoha and its sequels A's and StrikerS, Wrath and Maria) and she was also part of the voice actress quartet "Prits", alongside Yumiko Kobayashi, Natsuko Kuwatani and Hisayo Mochizuki (all four voiced characters in the anime Sister Princess). Nana Mizuki voices Microsoft's Japanese Windows 7 unofficial "OS-tan" mascot, Nanami Madobe. The mascot's name uses some wordplay on Mizuki's own name as well as the operating system ("Nana" = "seven").

In the middle of February 2010, Mizuki was named her hometown (Niihama, Ehime)'s First Tourism Ambassador. The news was broadcast during her Live Academy 2010 tour, held in Kanagawa, Osaka, Aichi, Miyagi, Fukuoka, Ehime Prefecture Niihama Cultural Center's Hall. There were 7 lessons in total. In 2010, Mizuki won the Tomiyama Kei Award in the 4th Seiyu Awards for her news hook in the year 2009. In 2010, she also participated in 61st NHK Kōhaku Uta Gassen singing "Phantom Minds", the single which had topped Oricon Charts.

On January 21, 2011, she released her first autobiography, titled Shin Ai, to commemorate the 10th anniversary of her singing career. Mizuki won Top Pop Artists award in Billboard Japan Music Awards 2010 on February 6, 2011, together with 4 other artists: AKB48, Nishino Kana, SID and Exile.

Mizuki has participated in the 60th (2009), 61st (2010), 62nd (2011), 63rd (2012), 64th (2013) and the 65th (2014) edition of the Kōhaku Uta Gassen produced by Japanese public broadcaster NHK.  On December 3–4, 2011 she had a two-day concert at Tokyo Dome. She became the first voice actress and 8th Japanese female solo artist to hold a concert at Japan's largest concert hall. On March 3, 2012, Mizuki won Animation Artist of the Year 2011 award in Billboard Japan Music Awards 2011.

On November 10, 2013, Mizuki performed Preserved Roses, Kakumei Dualism and Heart of Sword -Yoakemae- in her first overseas performance as a guest performer for T.M.Revolution at Anime Festival Asia, Singapore, Valvrave night. On November 23–24, 2013, Mizuki held her first solo concert outside Japan, in Taiwan.

In March 2014, at the 64th Annual MEXT Art Encouragement Prizes Nana Mizuki was recognized as Rookie of the Year in the Popular Entertainment division.

She held her second overseas solo concert in Singapore (September 27, 2014) and Taiwan (October 4–5, 2014) entitled "Nana Mizuki Live Flight 2014+".

On September 22, 2016, she held a concert at Koshien Stadium, Japan's oldest stadium, becoming the first voice actress and the first solo artist to hold a concert at the venue.

In July 2017, Mizuki made her debut as a stage actress in a Japanese production of Beautiful: The Carole King Musical in the title role.

On September 30, 2017, she performed in the opening ceremony of 72nd National Sports Festival of Japan, held at Ningineer Stadium in Ehime, in front of Emperor Akihito, Empress Michiko and approximately 20,000 attendees.

She held a 7-day long concert series at the Nippon Budokan in January 2018.

Personal life 

Mizuki announced her marriage to a person in the music industry on July 7, 2020, on her blog. On November 6, 2020, she announced on her blog that she was pregnant with her first child. On March 16, 2021, Mizuki announced on her blog that she’d successfully given birth to her first child. On April 23, 2022, she tested positive for COVID-19 but later recovered and returned to work.

Filmography

Anime

Original video animation

Anime films

Drama CD

Tokusatsu

Television drama/Movie

Video games

Dubbing roles

† Year of original release‡ Year of Japanese release

Discography 

Studio albums
 2001: Supersonic Girl
 2002: Magic Attraction
 2003: Dream Skipper
 2004: Alive & Kicking
 2006: Hybrid Universe
 2007: Great Activity
 2009: Ultimate Diamond
 2010: Impact Exciter
 2012: Rockbound Neighbors
 2014: Supernal Liberty
 2015: Smashing Anthems
 2016: Neogene Creation
 2019: Cannonball Running
 2022: Delighted Reviver

Compilation albums
 2007: The Museum
 2011: The Museum II
 2018: The Museum III

Concerts

Personal concerts 
 2001: Nana Mizuki X'mas Live "Supersonic Girl"
 2003: Nana Mizuki Live Attraction
 2003: Nana Mizuki Live Sensation Zepp Side/Hall Side
 2003-2004: Nana Mizuki Live Skipper Countdown
 2004: Nana Mizuki Live Spark
 2004: Nana Mizuki 20th Birthday Anniversary Live
 2004-2005: Nana Mizuki Live Rainbow
 2005: Nana Mizuki Live Rocket
 2005: Nana Mizuki 21 Anniversary Concert "Happy"
 2006: Nana Mizuki Livedom -Birth-
 2006: Nana Mizuki Live Universe
 2007: Nana Mizuki Live Museum 2007
 2007: Nana Summer Festa 2007
 2007-2008: Nana Mizuki Live Formula 2007-2008
 2008: Nana Mizuki Live Fighter 2008 Blue Side/Red Side
 2009: Nana Mizuki Live Fever 2009
 2009: Nana Mizuki Live Diamond 2009
 2010: Nana Mizuki Live Academy 2010
 2010: Nana Mizuki Live Games 2010 Red/Blue stage
 2011: Nana Mizuki Live Grace 2011 -Orchestra-
 2011: Nana Mizuki Live Journey 2011
 2011: Nana Mizuki Live Castle 2011 Queen's Night/King's Night
 2012: Nana Mizuki Live Union 2012
 2013: Nana Mizuki Live Grace 2013 -Opus II-
 2013: Nana Mizuki Live Circus 2013
 2014: Nana Winter Festa 2014
 2014: Nana Mizuki Live Flight 2014
 2015: Nana Mizuki Live Theater 2015 -Acoustic-
 2015: Nana Mizuki Live Adventure 2015
 2016: Nana Mizuki Live Galaxy 2016
 2016: Nana Mizuki Live Park 2016
 2017: Nana Mizuki Live Zipangu 2017
 2018: Nana Mizuki Live Gate 2018
 2018: Nana Mizuki Live Island 2018
 2019: Nana Mizuki Live Grace 2019 -Opus III-
 2019: Nana Mizuki Live Express 2019
 2020: Nana Mizuki Live Runner 2020 (Canceled)
 2022: Nana Mizuki Live Runner 2020 → 2022
 2022: Nana Mizuki Live Home 2022 
 2023: Nana Mizuki Live Heroes 2023

Other concerts 
 2001: Happy Lesson Concert
 2001: Memories Off 1st Concert
 2003: Memories Off 2nd Concert
 2005: Animelo Summer Live 2005
 2006: Animelo Summer Live 2006
 2007: Animelo Summer Live 2007
 2008: Animelo Summer Live 2008
 2009: Animelo Summer Live 2009
 2010: Animelo Summer Live 2010
 2011: Hibari 7 Days
 2011: Animelo Summer Live 2011
 2011: Clamp Festival 2011 Tokyo
 2012: Heian Jingu Hounou Kouen ~Sougetsu no Utage~
 2012: Symphogear Live 2012
 2013: Animelo Summer Live 2013
 2013: Inazuma Rock Fes 2013
 2013: Anime Festival Asia 2013
 2013: Symphogear Live 2013
 2014: Gold Disc Festival
 2014: Animelo Summer Live 2014
 2015: King Super Live 2015
 2015: Big Aquaplus Festival -20th Anniversary-
 2016: Symphogear Live 2016
 2016: Super Robot Wars Hagane no Kanshasai 2016
 2016: MBS presents "Watashi dake no Dorikamu – The Live in Banpaku Koen"
 2016: MTV Unplugged: Nana Mizuki
 2017: Izumo Taisha Go Hounou Kouen ~Gekka no Utage~
 2017: Suga Shikao 20th Anniversary "Suga Fes! ~20 Nen ni Ichido no Miracle Fes~"
 2017: T.M.R. Live Revolution'17 -20th Anniversary Final-
 2017: Animelo Summer Live 2017
 2018: Symphogear Live 2018
 2018: King Super Live 2018
 2019: PreCure 15th Anniversary Live ~15☆Dreams Come True!~
 2019: Nana Music Laboratory 2019 ~Nana Labo~
 2020: Symphogear Live 2020 (Cancelled)
 2022: Symphogear Live 2020 → 2022

Musical Theatre 
 2017: Beautiful: The Carole King Musical

TV Show 
 2010: Dai 61 kai NHK kôhaku uta gassen (TV Special) 
 2011: Dai 61 kai NHK kôhaku uta gassen (TV Special) 
 2012: 2012 FNS Kayôsai (TV Special) 
 2012: The 63rd Annual NHK kôhaku uta gassen (TV Special) 
 2012: Music Fair (TV Series) 
 2013: 2013 FNS Kayôsai (TV Special)
 2014: The 65th Annual NHK kôhaku uta gassen (TV Special) 
 2015: Kon'yamo nama de Sada Masashi: Nihon isshuu tassei daikanshasai (TV Movie) 
 2015: Entertainment Nippon (TV Series documentary) 
 2015: Rekishi hiwa hisutoria (TV Series documentary) 
 2015: Sôkai jôhô variety Sukkiri!! (TV Series) 
 2015: FNS Music Festival: Part 1 (TV Special)  
 2015: FNS Music Festival: Part 2 (TV Special)  
 2016: Mizuki Nana Special ~ Neogene Creation (guest: Shikao Suga) (Spaceshower TV special)
 2017: NHK Kayou Charity Concert 4/2017 (TV Special)  
 2017: Ongaku no Hi (TV Special)  
 2017: NICO LIVE DESTINY'S PRELUDE/TESTAMENT  
 2017: NANA MIZUKI PREMIUM LIVE SELECTION @ WAKUWAKU JAPAN

References

External links 
  
 
 

1980 births
Living people
Anime singers
Enka singers
Horikoshi High School alumni
Japanese child singers
Japanese women pop singers
Japanese women rock singers
Japanese women singer-songwriters
Japanese idols
Japanese video game actresses
Japanese voice actresses
King Records (Japan) artists
Musicians from Ehime Prefecture
Prits members
Video game musicians
Voice actresses from Ehime Prefecture
Japanese stage actresses
20th-century Japanese actresses
21st-century Japanese actresses
20th-century Japanese women singers
20th-century Japanese singers
21st-century Japanese women singers
21st-century Japanese singers